"My Bag" (stylized in all caps) is a song by South Korean girl group (G)I-dle for their first studio album, I Never Die released on March 14, 2022, as the eight-track on the album. Written by Soyeon and co-produced by Nathan, the song's musical style focuses on the rap by all members of (G)I-dle as Soyeon commented the song "[is] something that only (G)I-dle can do". A part of the song interpolates elements from their debut single "Latata", which was released on May 2, 2018.

Background and composition
On February 17, 2022, Cube Entertainment announced that (G)I-dle will be making a comeback in March about a year and two months since I Burn released in January 2021, and is preparing for a new album. On February 24, it was reported that the group will be releasing their debut studio album, I Never Die on March 14 digitally. "My Bag" was written and composed by Soyeon, with additional composition credits by Nathan and Flip_00. (G)I-dle's Shuhua said the song is the album's "special song" and shared: I did rap and that made me want to be a cool rapper like Soyeon. I want to learn from her.

"My Bag" is a hip-hop track that has a strong bass accompanied by catchy Korean rhymes. In terms of musical notation, the song is composed in the key of G-sharp minor, with a tempo of 94 beats per minute, and runs for two minutes and forty seconds.

Critical reception
Tanu I. Raj of NME stated that "My Bag" is "bombastic and proud" as the song fits (G)I-dle, further describing the song "falls prey to hyperbolic and outdated hip-hop trappings – flexing wealth can only be so fresh – the neat arrangement balances it out". Writing for Genius, Addison Murray labelled the track as a "flex anthem" and noted the track's similarity to their debut track "Latata" commenting that "they're celebrating their past achievements while flaunting their current success". Sofia Gomez from The Kraze describe that the song when it "plays on your speakers, this is the moment to have fun and enjoy the vibey hip-hop track that will be liked by many for its eccentric style."

Commercial performance
"My Bag" debuted at position 116 on South Korea's Gaon Digital Chart in the chart issue dated March 13–19, 2022. The song also debuted at position 18 and position 170 on Gaon Download Chart and Gaon Streaming Chart, respectively. The song then ascended to position 79 in the chart issue dated March 20–26, 2022, and debuted at position 74 on Billboard K-pop Hot 100.

Live performance
As part of the album promotion, on their first promotion week, "My Bag" was performed along with the title track on M Countdown, which aired on March 17, 2022.

Promotion
Prior to the album's release, on February 26, 2022, Cube released the album scheduler, which hinted 'What's in My Bag?' on March 8, 2022. Later, it was revealed a track video was released on the group's official YouTube channel. It showed (G)I-dle racing in supercars and a powerful group dance to the rap lyrics of "My Bag". On March 14, 2022, (G)I-dle held a live event called "(G)I-dle 1st Full Album [I Never Die] GV_CINEMATIC LiVE" on YouTube to introduce the album and its songs, including "My Bag". A choreography video for the song was released on March 28, 2022.

Credits and personnel
Credits are adapted from Cube Entertainment, and NetEase Music.

 (G)I-dle – Vocals
 Soyeon – Producer, songwriter, background vocal
 Nathan – Producer, audio engineer, keyboard
 Flip_00 – Audio engineer, drum, 
 Jeon Jae-hee – background vocal
 Choi Ye-ji  – Record engineering
 Anchor  – audio mixing
 Kwon Nam-woo  – Audio mastering
 Jang Seung-ho  – Assistant audio mastering

Charts

Weekly charts

Monthly charts

Year-end charts

References

External links
 
 

2022 songs
(G)I-dle songs
Korean-language songs
Songs written by Jeon So-yeon